This is a list of the resident commissioners of the New Hebrides, an Anglo-French condominium encompassing the territory of the present-day Republic of Vanuatu, that was divided into two separate communities: one Anglophone and one Francophone.

List of officeholders

For continuation after independence, see: President of Vanuatu

See also
 History of Vanuatu
 Politics of Vanuatu
 President of Vanuatu
 Prime Minister of Vanuatu

References

External links
 World Statesmen – Vanuatu

New Hebrides
History of Vanuatu
European colonisation in Oceania
Lists of office-holders
Vanuatu and the Commonwealth of Nations
List
List
1887 establishments in Oceania
1980 disestablishments in Oceania